Amitav Ghosh (1930–16 September 2020) was an Indian banker. He served for 20 days from 15 January to 4 February 1985, as the 16th governor of the Reserve Bank of India. His term was the shortest ever served by any Reserve Bank of India governor. He died at age 90.

Career
Previously, Ghosh had been appointed RBI deputy governor. Before this Ghosh was the chairman of Allahabad Bank. He was also a Director of the IDBI Bank and was on the governing body of the National Institute of Bank Management.

Notes

References
 List of Governors of RBI

1930 births
2020 deaths
Indian bankers
Indian civil servants
Governors of the Reserve Bank of India
Businesspeople from Kolkata